Pratibad [English: Protest] is a 2001 Indian Bengali language action drama directed by Haranath Chakraborty.

Plot
The story is of a middle-class family struggling financially. The family consists of two sisters, mother and father. Prosenjit Chatterjee as a Rana is the main and a promising character. He is a daredevil and a terrific fighter against injustice. Once, he was travelling with his pregnant sister in a train, he begged everybody for a seat for his sister, but no one paid heed. There were some burglars in the train who started looting, but Rana saved it from happening. By this act, he was given the job of a police officer. In Rana's area of jurisdiction, there lived an MLA name Bikas. He was a very corrupt politician and indulged in illegal activities. There lived another man Azad who fought against injustice everywhere. Now this minister's girl Jaya, fell in love with Rana. Once, it so happened that while Rana's sister was about to give birth to her child, this minister, Bikas, tried to kill Rana, but his sister was injured and ultimately died. Then Rana decided to take revenge but was initially not allowed to do so. Ultimately MLA Bikas's real character was revealed, and in a serious fighting with Rana, MLA Bikas dies.

Cast
Prosenjit Chatterjee as Rana Mitra, an ordinary person
Arpita Pal as Jaya
Ranjit Mallick as Azad Da
Laboni Sarkar as MP Namita Sanyal
Deepankar De as Kalu Prasad, Central Home Minister
Anamika Saha as Beena Mitra, Rana's Mother
Nirmal Kumar as Pratap Mitra, Rana's Father
 Bharat Kaul
Srila Majumder as Meenu, Rana's elder sister
 Pushpita Mukherjee as Tina, Rana's sister
 Subhasish Mukherjee as Police Constable
 Mitali Chakraborty as Meenu
 Monu Mukherjee as Anil Manna, Landlord
Rajesh Sharma as Tinu
Debesh Roy Chowdhury as MLA Bikash Dutta

Soundtrack

The album is composed by Babul Bose, while lyrics are penned by Goutam Susmit. The background score is composed by S. P. Venkatesh.
Babul Supriyo, Kumar Sanu, 
Poornima, Sadhana Sargam, Miss Jojo has given their voices for the album.

References
 https://web.archive.org/web/20140323194851/http://prosenjit.in/home
 https://www.hotstar.com/in/movies/pratibad/1770002575/watch
 https://www.hungama.com/movie/pratibad/22865644/

External links

Bengali-language Indian films
Indian police films
Indian action films
Fictional portrayals of the West Bengal Police
2000s Bengali-language films
2001 action films
2001 films
2000s police films
Films scored by Babul Bose
Films directed by Haranath Chakraborty